Houston Harriman Harte was a newspaperman who co-founded Harte-Hanks Communications.

Harte was born January 12, 1893, in Knob Noster, Missouri. After a year at the University of California, Harte returned to the University of Missouri, where he received his degree in journalism in 1915.

Journalism

Harte went to work as Business Manager for the Missouri Republican and was then its editor and publisher until 1920.

Hanks' first newspaper acquisitions were the Abilene Reporter-News and the San Angelo Standard. During the 1920’s and 30’s, he continued to acquire other newspapers, including the Corpus Christi Times . Harte-Hanks Newspapers was created in 1948.

At the time of his death, in 1972, the company owned a television station and 19 newspapers across six states.

Other Activities

While leading his first newspaper, Harte also served as a captain during World War I (1918-1919).

Harte created the book In Our Image along with Time illustrator, Guy Rowe, a collection of Bible stories published in 1949 by Oxford University Press. For that book, the two men won a Christopher Award.

Harte was instrumental in preserving historic Fort Concho in San Angelo. He also donated substantially to Angelo State University, and served on the board of directors for Texas Technological College (now Texas Tech University).

Harte was also a confidante of U.S. President Lyndon B. Johnson. His association with Johnson led him to end his longstanding friendship with a leading Johnson critic, the historian J. Evetts Haley.

Harte married Caroline Isabel McCutcheon in 1921. Their two sons, Edward H. Harte and Houston H. Harte also became prominent newspaper publishers. Harte died March 1972 in San Angelo, Texas.

References 

1893 births
1972 deaths
People from Missouri
People from San Angelo, Texas
American newspaper chain founders
20th-century American newspaper publishers (people)
Harte family (United States)
Christian writers
Texas Democrats
Texas Tech University System regents
Writers from Missouri
Writers from Texas
University of Missouri alumni
20th-century American businesspeople
University of California, Berkeley alumni
20th-century American academics